Dipterocome is a genus of flowering plants in the family Asteraceae.

There is only one known species, Dipterocome pusilla, native to a large region extending from Greece and Israel to Kazakhstan.

References

Cynareae
Monotypic Asteraceae genera
Flora of Asia
Flora of Greece